The Coggin College of Business is the business school of the University of North Florida, a public research university in Jacksonville, Florida. About 2,850 students are enrolled in the college, including undergraduate and graduate students. It is one of UNF's three original colleges. Two of the college's programs, the international business program and the transportation and logistics program, are designated as flagship programs at UNF. Coggin is accredited by the AACSB. It was named the Coggin College of Business in 2002 honoring Luther and Blanch Coggin, after a $5 million gift.

The college has over 13,500 alumni.

Academics
The college offers both undergraduate and graduate degrees in multiple areas of study.  Undergraduates pursue the Bachelor of Business Administration degree, for which various major and minor fields of study are offered.

Graduates have available three degrees programs: Master of Accountancy, Master of Business Administration, and Master of Science. The college also offers a graduate certificate in e-Business.

Student organizations
The Osprey Financial Group is the college's student managed investment fund. The group is a combination class/student organization; over the course of two semesters selected students are given the opportunity to manage a real portfolio of investments.  Students gain real world money management experience as well as experience in using investment tools such as Bloomberg Terminals and Morningstar's investment analysis platform.  The group is housed in the State Farm Companies Foundation Center for Financial Research in the Coggin Business Administration Building.

Additionally, Coggin is also  host to many subject specific clubs and organizations, including:
Alpha Kappa Psi
Alpha Sigma Pi
American Marketing Association
Delta Sigma Pi
Rotaract
Beta Gamma Sigma Business Honor Society.

Study abroad and international partners
The Coggin College of Business offers numerous opportunities for students to study abroad.  One option is short term faculty lead trips usually around 10 days in length. Another is semester long exchanges in countries such as UAE, UK, China, Argentina, and Germany among others.  Dual degree programs are also available.  Undergraduates can earn dual degrees with UNF and KEDGE Business School in France.  Graduate students have available the GlobalMBA program.  In this program students spend one semester each at four universities: The Technical University of Cologne in Germany, Kyungpook National University in South Korea, the University of Warsaw in Poland, and UNF.  Upon completion students earn an MBA from UNF and a Master of International Management and Intercultural Communication jointly from the University of Warsaw and the Technical University of Cologne.

Business centers
Coggin business centers focus on research in different subjects to provide a diverse range of business data to the Jacksonville community.  
 Coggin Center for Entrepreneurship and Innovation, located in downtown Jacksonville.
 Center for International Business Studies, part of the flagship international business program.
 Local Economic Indicators Project, economic research focusing on Jacksonville and the state of Florida as well as US and world trends.
 Small Business Development Center, part of the Florida SBDC network and the National Association of Small Business Development Centers.

Facility

The Coggin College of Business Administration building (or building 42) is the home of the college. The  facility has fourteen classrooms (with capacities of 36-54),  an auditorium, three business technology classrooms, five student skills labs, and a special Trading Room for student Investment Analysts of the Osprey Financial Group.  The facility houses numerous administrative and professor's offices as well as the Career Management Center, offering internship and career services exclusively for Coggin students. The building opened in 1996 at a cost of $7.8 million.

External links
Official website

References

Business schools in Florida
Educational institutions established in 1972
University of North Florida
University subdivisions in Florida
1972 establishments in Florida